Robaia may refer to several places in Romania:

 Robaia, a village in Mușătești Commune, Argeș County
 Robaia, a village in Berislăvești Commune, Vâlcea County
 Robaia (river), a tributary of the Vâlsan in Argeș County